XFV may refer to:
Lockheed XFV
Rockwell XFV-12
SoloTrek XFV